Naour, also called Naur, is region number 26 in the Greater Amman Municipality. It is located on the west side of the capital, and comprises 26 neighborhoods or residential areas. Naour comprises approximately 87 km2, i.e., 5.19%, of the total landscape of Greater Amman Municipality. Its population is 50,000 and it is bordered by six regions.

History
The down town of Naour was established by the Circassian immigrants who migrated  from their homeland Circassia (Cherkessia) in the North Caucasus in 1900. The Circassian immigration was one of the latest Circassian immigrations which started in 1864 as a result of the Russian army control over Circassia after about 150 years of war. The number of the Circassian families which established Naour was about 55 families, descending from different Circassians tribes like the Abzakh, Shapsugs, Bazadough and a few from the Kabarday. They established a big mosque in the center of the town, after building their homes and built elementary school, grain mills, water springs, roads, fields, gardens, shops, carpentry shops and blacksmith shops.

Naour's inhabitants are from different groups and ethnicities, from different races, religions, and roots. These include Bedouins like Al-Ajarmah, Circassians, villagers like Al-Thawabeieh (originally from Tafilah), Christians originally from Salt and Palestinians who came after 1948 and 1967.

Some of the Naourian families moved to a bounded district called Marj Al-Hamam, where a large area of its lands were meadows (fields) – owned by the Naourian families – for the families and tribes from Naour, like the Circassians and Al-Ajarmah (Al-Ofeshat). These peoples, however, still consider themselves to be Naourians and have participated in the elections of the charity associations, etc.

Naour is considered to be a patriotic district and has participated in many major events that have occurred in Jordan. Several of Jordan's most prominent historical figures (who were influential in different battles and wars) hailed from Na'our. Furthermore, several Naourians have served as high-ranking government officials and military officers, and a number of Naourians have also been famous writers, laureates, etc.

Issa Al-Naouri (the Naourian), for example, is considered to be among the most influential writers in Jordan and Palestine

King Abdullah II has visited Naour for several times and the last royal visit took place in 2011

In June 2021 the Jordanian political system was rocked by the news of Osama Al Ajarmeh, an MP from Naour, reportedly "making to his followers in Naour threatening remarks about the king, and insulting the monarch.
Footage on social media showed Mr Al Ajarmeh brandishing a sword and wearing a concealed gun holster. In the aftermath, the Jordanian Parliament moved to expel Al Ajarmeh. In the aftermath, security forces confronted Mr Al Ajarmeh's supporters who had gathered in Naour, some of them firing guns in the air. However, an armed clash was avoided and on the following  day the gatherings largely subsided, without having gotten to an all-out clash.

See also
 Ethnic cleansing of Circassians
 Amman

References

Populated places in Amman Governorate
Districts of Amman
1900 establishments in the Ottoman Empire